Ghazaleh is both a given name and a surname. Notable people with the name include:

Ghazaleh Alizadeh (1947–1996), Iranian poet and writer
Midhat J. Gazalé (1929–2009), Egyptian scientist
Nawaf Ghazaleh (1927–2005), Syrian assassin
Rustum Ghazaleh (1953–2015), Syrian military officer
Al-Ghazali (1058-1111 CE), Persian theologian, jurist, philosopher, and mystic
 Ghazaleh Chalabi, Iranian protester killed by Islamic Republic regime

See also

 Beit Ghazaleh ('Ġazaleh House'), a palace from the Ottoman period in Aleppo
Talal Abu-Ghazaleh (born 1938), Jordanian businessman
Shadia Abu Ghazaleh (1949-1968), Palestinian activist